Portrait of Vincenzo Mosti is a painting by Titian, executed around 1520 and now housed in the Galleria Palatina of Florence, Italy.

History
This work is mentioned in the gallery's 1687 inventory as a "copy of Titian believed to be original". In that of 1815, it is attributed to the Venetian School and in that of 1829 to an unknown artist. It has been reassigned to Titian after the elimination of the repaintures.

The subject is traditionally identified as Tommaso Mosti, a member of a family connected with the Este of Ferrara, based on an inscription in the reverse which says "Di Thomaso Mosti in età di anni XXV l'anno MDXXVI. Thitiano de Cadore pittore". However, the historical Mosti followed an ecclesiastical career, and thus the garments of the subject are not appropriate. More likely, the man could be his elder brother Vincenzo, who died in 1536, or Agostino. The dating in the inscription (1526) would be an error of transcription of a "0" as a "6".

See also
Man with a Glove

References

External links
 Galleria Palatina page

1520 paintings
Paintings in the collection of the Galleria Palatina
Mosti, Vincenzo